Manuel "Manolo" Noriega, (June 24, 1880 – August 12, 1961) was a Spanish-born Mexican stage and film actor, screenwriter, and film director.

Born Manuel Noriega Ruiz in Colombres, Spain, he worked in live theatre for many years, performing in his native Spain as well as in Mexico, Cuba and the United States. A pioneer in silent film, he made his first screen appearance in 1907. It is believed some of his early silent films have been lost, but his main body of work began in talkies in the early 1930s, performing in close to two hundred sound films.
Noriega earned an Ariel Award nomination for "Best Actor in a minor role" for his performance in the 1946 film Pepita Jiménez.

Married to Hortensia Castañeda Avila, their daughter Carmen became a singer who married Tito Guízar.

Noriega died of gastric ulcer in Mexico City on August 12, 1961, and is buried at the Panteón Jardín in Mexico City.

Selected filmography
 Heart of Gold (1923)
 These Men (1937)
 Here's the Point (1940)
 Jesusita in Chihuahua (1942)
 Beautiful Michoacán (1943)
 El Ametralladora (1943)
 The Two Orphans (1944)
 Porfirio Díaz (1944)
 My Memories of Mexico (1944)
 The White Monk (1945)
 Twilight (1945)
 Tragic Wedding (1946)
 The Lost Child (1947)
 The Thief (1947)
 Five Faces of Woman (1947)
 Fly Away, Young Man! (1947)
 The Desire (1948)
 The Genius (1948)
 The Magician (1949)
 What Has That Woman Done to You? (1951)
 María Montecristo (1951)
 Tehuantepec (1954)

External links

1880 births
1961 deaths
Spanish male film actors
Spanish male silent film actors
Spanish male stage actors
Spanish film directors
20th-century Spanish screenwriters
20th-century Spanish male actors
Mexican male film actors
Mexican male silent film actors
Mexican film directors
20th-century Mexican male actors
Actors from Asturias
Spanish emigrants to Mexico
20th-century Mexican screenwriters
20th-century Mexican male writers
20th-century Spanish male writers